Florina Sorina Hulpan (born 7 March 1997) is a Romanian weightlifter. She competed in the women's 69 kg event at the 2016 Summer Olympics.

References

External links
 
 

1997 births
Living people
Romanian female weightlifters
Olympic weightlifters of Romania
Weightlifters at the 2016 Summer Olympics
Place of birth missing (living people)
Weightlifters at the 2014 Summer Youth Olympics
21st-century Romanian women